Mamadou Kouyaté (born 13 September 1997) is a Malian footballer who plays for Sandvikens IF.

Career

Club career
In March 2018, Kouyaté joined AFC Eskilstuna from Malian club Yeelen Olympique. He made four appearances in the 2018 Superettan, before Eskilstuna were promoted to Allsvenskan for the 2019 season. Kouyaté made his Allsvenskan debut on 21 April 2019 in a 1-3 loss to Hammarby IF, where he was substituted in the 83rd minute for Ivan Bobko.

In July 2019, Kouyaté was loaned to Bodens BK. After returning, he was loaned out again in March 2020, this time to IFK Luleå for the 2020 season. In November 2020, it became clear that Kouyaté was staying with IFK Luleå on a permanent deal and that he had signed a three-year contract with the club.

In December 2021, Kouyaté was signed by Sandvikens IF.

References

External links
Mamadou Kouyaté at Fotbolltransfers

1997 births
Living people
Malian footballers
Association football midfielders
AFC Eskilstuna players
Bodens BK players
IFK Luleå players
Sandvikens IF players
Allsvenskan players
Superettan players
Ettan Fotboll players
Malian expatriate footballers
Expatriate footballers in Sweden
Malian expatriate sportspeople in Sweden
21st-century Malian people